Neptune Blood (junior) (1655-1716) was Anglican priest in Ireland in the late 17th and early 18th centuries .

The son of another ecclesiastical  Neptune Blood he too was educated at Trinity College, Dublin. He became Rector of Killilagh in 1680; and Treasurer of the Diocese of Kilfenora from 1688 to 1692; and Dean of Kilfenora from 1692 until his death.

References

Deans of Kilfenora
1655 births
1716 deaths
18th-century Irish Anglican priests
17th-century Irish Anglican priests
Alumni of Trinity College Dublin